Zoran Stojcevski (born 4 March 1971) is a former Swedish footballer and manager of Macedonian origin. He made 53 Allsvenskan appearances for Djurgårdens IF, and scored 5 goals. He managed Värtans IK in 2006.

In December 1994 he received a call by coach Andon Doncevski to represent Macedonia and was with the team for the UEFA Euro 1996 qualifying match against Cyprus in Skopje. However, he was not selected to take part at the game and remained at the stands.

Honours

Club 
 Djurgårdens IF 
 Division 1 Norra (2): 1994, 1998

References

Swedish footballers
Allsvenskan players
Djurgårdens IF Fotboll players
IFK Göteborg players
AFC Eskilstuna players
1971 births
Living people
Association football midfielders
Footballers from Gothenburg
Swedish people of Macedonian descent